The 1986–87 Duke Blue Devils men's basketball team represented Duke University. The head coach was Mike Krzyzewski and the team finished the season with an overall record of 24–9.

Schedule

|-
!colspan=9 style=| Regular Season

|-
!colspan=12 style=| ACC Tournament

|-
!colspan=12 style=| NCAA Tournament

Rankings

References

Duke
Duke
Duke Blue Devils men's basketball seasons
Duke Blue Devils men's basketball
Duke Blue Devils men's basketball